The Shpageeza Cricket League (SCL, also known as the Alokozay Cola Shpageeza Cricket League for sponsorship reasons and Etisalat Sixes T20) is a Twenty20 cricket tournament organized by the Afghanistan Cricket Board every year in Afghanistan. The Shpageeza tournament is established with eight franchises, including players from the national team, overseas, players from the ‘A’ team and players from the under 19 team as well as elite performers from the respective regions participating in this tournament. In addition, ACB has given the league an identity by franchising all team while players will be selected through a draft for each team.

The ultimate goal of this 12-day tournament is promoting cricket and sport in Afghanistan and establishing peace through sport. The tournament is broadcast live on Afghanistan's prominent channel 1TV using HD quality production standards, and the tournament is commercialized by franchising and marketing each team to a company/organization. Through the design and broadcast of this tournament, Afghans will have firsthand access to watch their national players in their home ground.

History
The League was established in 2013 titled as Shpageeza Cricket Tournament. Five regional teams participated in the event and it was a successful initiative by Afghanistan Cricket Board. The champion of the first league was Speenghar Tigers for the inaugural edition of the tournament. The matches were telecast by Shamshad TV. 
The second edition in 2014 was conducted with the same number of teams, representing five regions in the country. Mis-e-Ainak Knights won the title championship. Gulbadin Naib was named Man of the tournament; Noor Ali Zadran was the best batsman and Rokhan Barekzai was named the best bowler of this edition. The matches were telecast on 1TV.
Starting from the 2017 season, the ICC granted List A status to the Twenty20 domestic competition (List A rather than Twenty20 status as Afghanistan did not have a domestic 50-over tournament). In May 2017 however, the ICC recognised Afghanistan's 50-over Ghazi Amanullah Khan Regional One Day Tournament by granting it List A status and matches in the 2017 Shpageeza cricket league are classified as Twenty20 status.

Teams

Shpageeza Cricket League was played among 5 regions of Afghanistan but a sixth team Kabul Eagles, officially sponsored by Aatif Mashal was added in the 2015 edition. In 2021, two new teams, Hindukush Stars and Pamir Zalmi were added. Following teams participate in the Shpageeza T20 Tournament:

Sponsors
Alokozay Group of Companies
Polio Eradication Program Afghanistan
Voice of America

TV rights
The TV rights were won by the Afghan channel named 1TV.

The state owned channels RTA  and RTA Sports are the broadcasters of the 2019 and 2020 editions.

See also
Afghanistan Cricket Board
Out of the Ashes
Kabir Khan
Taj Malik
Hamid Hassan

References

External links
Official website of Afghanistan Cricket Board
info about Afghan Domestic cricket.
Shpagiza tournament schedule 2014
Shpagiza T20 Prediction
ball by ball info
Official Twitter account of Shpageeza 2022

 
2013 establishments in Afghanistan
Afghan domestic cricket competitions
Sports leagues established in 2013
Cricket in Afghanistan
Twenty20 cricket leagues
Professional cricket leagues